The South Park Bridge (also called the 14th/16th Avenue South Bridge) is a Scherzer rolling lift double-leaf bascule bridge in Seattle, Washington, United States. The bridge is operated by the King County government, It carries automobile traffic over the Duwamish River  near Boeing Field, just outside the city limits of Seattle, and is named for the nearby South Park neighborhood of Seattle. It was listed on the National Register of Historic Places in 1982, as the 14th Avenue South Bridge.

The original bridge was constructed in 1929–31. Prior to its 2010 closure for rebuilding, about 20,000 vehicles used the bridge daily, and it was a main connection to South Park's main business district. Due to safety concerns, the bridge was closed to traffic on June 30, 2010, and its bascule draw-span leaves were removed in August 2010. County officials secured funds for replacement of the draw span, and work to replace the bridge began in May 2011. The new bridge opened to traffic on June 30, 2014.

Replacement
The original bridge was already in poor condition when it was further damaged by the Nisqually earthquake of 2001. In 2002, King County inspectors gave the bridge a score of 6 out of a possible 100, per Federal Highway Administration criteria, and the rating later fell to as low as 4. This compares to a score of 50 for the I-35W Mississippi River bridge, which collapsed in August 2007.

Due to lack of county, state and federal funding for a proposed replacement project, the South Park Bridge continued to operate in its deteriorated condition.  Although plans to build a new bridge were ready, the project failed to receive a $99 million federal TIGER I grant in early 2010. The bridge was finally closed June 30, 2010, at 7:00 p.m. Earlier that month, King County secured $10 million toward the replacement of bridge. Dismantling of the bridge began in late August 2010, with removal of the lift span sections, even while the outlook for the proposed replacement project remained unclear.

In August 2010, the County submitted a grant application for $36.2 million in federal funds from the second round of federal Transportation Investment Generating Economic Recovery grants, TIGER II. On October 15, 2010, it was announced that the South Park Bridge had been awarded $34 million in TIGER II financing, filling the funding gap and allowing work to replace the bridge to move forward. In March 2011, King County announced that the new bridge would be constructed by Kiewit-Massman, a joint venture of Kiewit Infrastructure West Company and Massman Construction Company.
Rebuilding began in May 2011. A ceremonial grand opening event was held for the newly completed South Park Bridge on June 29, 2014, and it officially opened to traffic the following day, June 30, 2014.

See also
 Past South Park bridges

References

External links

 South Park Bridge project page
 South Park Bridge closure page
 SOUTH PARK BRIDGE PROJECT Draft Environmental Impact Statement and Section 4(f) Evaluation EXECUTIVE SUMMARY, U.S. Department of Transportation Federal Highway Administration, Washington State Department of Transportation, and King County Department of Transportation, September 2005

Bascule bridges in the United States
Bridges in Seattle
Road bridges on the National Register of Historic Places in Washington (state)
National Register of Historic Places in Seattle
Landmarks in King County, Washington 
Bridges completed in 1931
Drawbridges on the National Register of Historic Places